Cymindis alutacea is a species of ground beetle in the subfamily Harpalinae. It was described by Thomas Vernon Wollaston in 1867.

References

Beetles described in 1867
alutacea